Soul Mist! is an album by jazz organist Richard "Groove" Holmes which was recorded in 1966 but not released on the Prestige label until 1970.

Reception

Allmusic awarded the album 4 stars stating "A standards-heavy date, 1966's Soul Mist is one of Richard "Groove" Holmes' most relaxed and swinging discs... An often-overlooked gem in Richard "Groove" Holmes' extensive catalog, Soul Mist is well worth seeking out".

Track listing 
 "Autumn Leaves" (Joseph Kosma, Johnny Mercer, Jacques Prévert) - 4:45
 "There Is No Greater Love" (Isham Jones, Marty Symes) - 6:45  
 "Denise" (Richard "Groove" Holmes) - 5:27
 "Things Ain't What They Used to Be" (Mercer Ellington, Ted Persons) - 7:50  
 "Up Jumped Spring" (Freddie Hubbard) - 6:50 
Recorded at Van Gelder Studio in Englewood Cliffs, New Jersey on March 15, 1966 (tracks 3 & 5) and July 7, 1966 (tracks 1, 2 & 4)

Personnel 
Richard "Groove" Holmes - organ
Blue Mitchell - trumpet (tracks 2 & 4)
Harold Vick - tenor saxophone (tracks 2 & 4)
Gene Edwards - guitar
George Randall (tracks 1, 2 & 4), Freddie Waits (tracks 3 & 5) - drums.

References 

Richard Holmes (organist) albums
1970 albums
Prestige Records albums
Albums recorded at Van Gelder Studio
Albums produced by Cal Lampley